The small Lifou white-eye (Zosterops minutus), also known as the sulphur white-eye, is a species of bird in the family Zosteropidae. It is endemic to the island of Lifou in New Caledonia.

References

Birds described in 1878
Endemic birds of New Caledonia
Zosterops
Taxonomy articles created by Polbot